Jules Bonnaire (born 13 December 1991) is a French freestyle skier. He is a participant at the 2014 Winter Olympics in Sochi.

References

1991 births
Freestyle skiers at the 2014 Winter Olympics
Living people
Olympic freestyle skiers of France
French male freestyle skiers